Bourgeanic acid is a fatty acid with the molecular formula C22H42O5. Bourgeanic acid is a lichen metabolite.

References

Further reading 

 
 

Lichen products
Fatty acids